Lorenzo Thomas Ribble, Jr. (March 28, 1907 – November 3, 1943) was a professional football player in the National Football League for the Portsmouth Spartans, Chicago Cardinals and Pittsburgh Pirates. He also played in the second American Football League for the Pittsburgh Americans. He also played for the independent St. Louis Gunners in 1932 and the Memphis Tigers in 1933. The Gunners did not join the NFL until 1934.

Notes

References

1907 births
1943 deaths
American football guards
American football tackles
Chicago Cardinals players
Pittsburgh Americans players
Pittsburgh Pirates (football) players
Portsmouth Spartans players
St. Louis Gunners players
Hardin–Simmons Cowboys football players
Players of American football from Texas
People from Brownwood, Texas